WFL may refer to:

Football
Western Football League, an English football league
Wilmington Football League, an American football league that played from 1929 to 1955
Wimmera Football League, an Australian football league
Women's Football League, an American women's football league that played from 2002 to 2007
World Football League, an American football league that played in 1974 and 1975

Other
WFL Drum Company, founded by William F. Ludwig, Sr., and precursor to Ludwig Drums
Wiedemann–Franz law relating electrical to thermal conductivity of metals
Win for Life, a type of American lottery
Women's Freedom League, a British organisation that campaigned for women's suffrage and sexual equality
Work Flow Language, the process control language for the Burroughs large systems
WWE Fastlane, a series of professional wrestling pay-per-view events
"WFL" or "Wrote for Luck", a song by Happy Mondays on the 1988 album Bummed

See also
 
 WIFL (disambiguation)
 Wiffle (disambiguation)